Ladozhskaya is a rural locality (a stanitsa) in Ust-Labinsky District of Krasnodar Krai, Russia, located on the Kuban River. Population:

References

1802 establishments in the Russian Empire
Populated places established in 1802
Rural localities in Krasnodar Krai